708090 is a 2016 Chinese romantic drama film directed by Lin Yiqi, Deng Jianquan and Chen Muchuan. It features Kenji Wu, Song Ji-hyo, Zhao Yihuan, Ray Lui, Irene Wan, Duo Liang, Li Fengming, Chen Rui and Lau Shek-yin. Production started in September 14, 2014 in Shenzhen and ended on October 20, 2014 in Phnom Penh. The film was released in China by Beijing Huaxinbo Media on May 20, 2016.

Plot
A woman happily in love with her husband looks to find her own success in life as China undergoes economic and cultural changes.

Cast
 Kenji Wu
 Song Ji-hyo as duan yu rong
 Zhao Yihuan as Lin Meiqing, a university student.
 Ray Lui as Feng Huaping
 Irene Wan as Zhao Yuanyuan
 Duo Liang
 Li Fengming
 Chen Rui as Qian Hai
 Lau Shek-yin
 Zhao Chenyan
 Li Donghan
 Shang Kan
 Jolie Fan

Production
Filming took place in Shenzhen, Shangri-La and Phnom Penh.

Reception
The film has grossed  at the Chinese box office.

References

External links
 
 

Films shot in Guangdong
Films set in Guangdong
Films shot in Yunnan
Films shot in Cambodia
2016 films
Chinese romantic drama films
2016 romantic drama films
2010s Mandarin-language films